James "Jim" Stevens (born July 16, 1984 in Würzburg) is a German-born American soccer player who last played for Real Maryland Monarchs in the USL Second Division.

Career

College
Stevens grew up in Clifton, Virginia, attended Centreville High School, and played four years of college soccer at Lehigh University, where he was a Second-Team All-Patriot League selection junior. At 6'7", he was one of the tallest players in college soccer, which earned him the nickname "Tall" among the Lehigh players.

Professional
Stevens began his professional career in 2006 when he signed with the Harrisburg City Islanders in the USL Second Division. He made his professional debut on June 3, 2006 in a 3-0 win over the Long Island Rough Riders.

Stevens dropped down a division to play for the Northern Virginia Royals as an over age player in the USL Premier Development League in 2007, and stayed with the Royals for two seasons before moving back to USL2 with the Real Maryland Monarchs in 2009.

External links
Real Maryland Monarchs bio
Lehigh bio

References

1984 births
Living people
American soccer players
Penn FC players
Lehigh Mountain Hawks men's soccer players
Northern Virginia Royals players
Midland-Odessa Sockers FC players
Real Maryland F.C. players
USL League Two players
USL Second Division players
Sportspeople from Fairfax County, Virginia
People from Clifton, Virginia
Association football forwards